Joseph Rogers Underwood (October 24, 1791 – August 23, 1876) was a lawyer, judge, United States Representative and Senator from Kentucky.

Early and family life
Joseph Underwood was born in Goochland County, Virginia to John Underwood, a veteran of the American Revolutionary War, and his wife Frances Rogers. His younger brother Warner Lewis Underwood later also represented Kentucky's 3rd Congressional district.

Joseph Underwood moved to Barren County, Kentucky in 1803 and lived with his uncle, Edmund Rogers. He attended private schools and graduated from Transylvania College in Lexington, Kentucky in 1811. He studied read law in Lexington under Robert Wickliffe, but interrupted those studies to serve in the War of 1812 as a Lieutenant in the Thirteenth Regiment of the Kentucky Infantry.

He married Eliza McCowes Trotter on March 26, 1817 and they had several children before her death in 1835, including Eugene Underwood (1818-1893), Julia Underwood Cox (1822-1875)(whose Washington D.C. husband John Threlkeld Cox, the son of the Mayor of Georgetown would become a Confederate cavalry colonel and perhaps brevet brigadier general), Eliza Underwood Rutledge (1829-1865) (whose Tennessee husband became a Confederate Major) and Jane Underwood Rogers (1830-1907). After her death, Underwood married Elizabeth Threlkeld Cox (1818-1884) (sister of John Threlkeld Cox who married his eldest daughter Julia). Their children included John Cox Underwood (1840-1913), Robert Underwood (1844-1907), Lily Underwood Munford (1854-1885), and Josephine Underwood Woods (1858-1920).

Career
He was admitted to the bar in 1813 and began practicing law in Glasgow, Kentucky.

Underwood served among Glasgow's town trustees and as county auditor until 1823. He was a member of the Kentucky House of Representatives from 1816 to 1819.

In 1823, he moved to Bowling Green, Kentucky, and again was elected to the State House of Representatives, serving from 1825 to 1826. He ran unsuccessfully for lieutenant governor of Kentucky in 1828, then served as a judge of the Court of Appeals from 1828 until 1835, following the Old Court-New Court controversy.

An opponent of Andrew Jackson and outspoken emancipationist, Underwood was elected as a Whig to the United States House of Representatives, serving Kentucky's District 3 from March 4, 1835 until March 3, 1843. There he was chairman of the U.S. House Committee on the District of Columbia. He declined to be a candidate for renomination in 1843, and resumed the practice of law. He was a presidential elector on the Whig ticket in 1844, and voters again elected him to the State House in 1846, where he served as speaker.

Underwood was elected as a Whig to the United States Senate and served from March 4, 1847 to March 3, 1853, when he did not run for reelection.

Underwood manumitted his slaves and sent them to Liberia, he also urged others to do likewise, although he supported the Compromise of 1850. Before the American Civil War, Underwood campaigned in Kentucky for the Constitutional Union Party.  He inherited seven slaves in 1858 when his older cousin died however he immediately manumitted them as well.  He wanted slavery to end, but also favored a form of gradual emancipation rather than immediate emancipation.  He did not believe the federal government had the authority to impose slavery-related laws on states according to the constitution, but was opposed to secession.  He ran for the state legislature again and was elected, serving two more terms, from 1861 to 1863 and fighting secessionists in the border state legislature. However, two of his sons would support the Confederacy. He attended the Democratic National Convention in 1864 and helped rebuild that party in the state.  During the civil war he was a "strong Union sympathizer" and was outspoken about his support for the union.

Death and legacy
Underwood died near Bowling Green and was interred in Fairview Cemetery. Western Kentucky University has his papers. His son John C. Underwood became a Confederate Engineer and later Bowling Green's city engineer and briefly mayor, as well as Kentucky's 21st Lieutenant Governor. His grandson Oscar Wilder Underwood (Eugene's son) became majority leader in the U.S. House as well as the U.S. Senate.

References

 Dictionary of American Biography

 Priest, Nancy L. "Joseph Rogers Underwood: Nineteenth Century Kentucky Orator." Register of the Kentucky Historical Society 75 (October 1977): 386-403
 Stickles, Arndt M., ed. "Joseph R. Underwood's Fragmentary Journal of the New and Old Court Contest in Kentucky." Filson Club History Quarterly 13 (October 1939): 202-10.

1791 births
1876 deaths
People from Goochland County, Virginia
American people of English descent
National Republican Party members of the United States House of Representatives from Kentucky
Whig Party members of the United States House of Representatives from Kentucky
Whig Party United States senators from Kentucky
Kentucky Constitutional Unionists
Speakers of the Kentucky House of Representatives
Democratic Party members of the Kentucky House of Representatives
Kentucky state senators
Judges of the Kentucky Court of Appeals
Kentucky lawyers
Transylvania University alumni
People from Kentucky in the War of 1812
People of Kentucky in the American Civil War
Southern Unionists in the American Civil War
19th-century American judges
19th-century American lawyers